Kaishevo (Qayış) is a rural locality (a village) in Staroyantuzovsky Selsoviet, Dyurtyulinsky District, Bashkortostan, Russia. The population was 197 as of 2010. There are 5 streets.

Geography 
Kaishevo is located 20 km southeast of Dyurtyuli (the district's administrative centre) by road. Staroyantuzovo is the nearest rural locality.

References 

Rural localities in Dyurtyulinsky District